AAT or Aat may refer to:

Aviation
 Asia Airfreight Terminal, Hong Kong International Airport
 Altay Airport, Xinjiang, China 
 Location identifier for Alturas Municipal Airport, California, United States

Biochemistry
 Alpha 1-antitrypsin, also α1-antitrypsin (A1AT), a glycoprotein
 Aspartate transaminase, or Aspartate Aminotransferase, an enzyme
 AAT, a codon for the amino acid Asparagine

Places
 Achanalt railway station
 Ath, Belgium
 Australian Antarctic Territory
 AutoAlliance Thailand, a joint venture automobile manufacturing plant

Science
 Anglo-Australian Telescope
 Animal-assisted therapy
 Aquatic Ape Theory, a theory in human evolution
 Ancient Astronauts; or Ancient Astronaut Theory

Technology
 Apple Advanced Typography, a font rendering technology

Other uses
 Aat (queen), an ancient Egyptian queen consort of the 12th dynasty
 Administrative Appeals Tribunal, in Australia
 And Another Thing (disambiguation)
 Art & Architecture Thesaurus, a controlled vocabulary used for describing items of art.
 Arvanitika, a variety of Albanian spoken in Greece
 Association of Accounting Technicians
 The Bible, An American Translation
 Armored Assault Tank, a Separatist tank in the prequel era of the Star Wars universe

See also
 A80 (disambiguation)